The Cat Is Out is the title of the sixth studio album by the British singer-songwriter Judie Tzuke, released in June 1985.

Four singles were released from the album: "You" (UK #92), "I'll Be The One" (UK #97), "Love Like Fire" and "This Side of Heaven". The album itself peaked at no. 35 in the UK.

Track listing
Side one
 "How Sweet It Is" (Mike Paxman, Judie Tzuke) – 4:42
 "Who Do You Really Love?" (Paul Muggleton, Bob Noble) – 4:35
 "Love Like Fire" (Tzuke, Paxman) – 4:14
 "I'll Be the One" (Muggleton, Noble) – 5:01
 "Girl Without a Name" (Muggleton, Noble) – 3:58

Side two
"This Side of Heaven" (Paxman, Muggleton) – 5:30
 "Harbour Lights" (Paxman, Tzuke) – 5:40
 "You" (Ivy Jo Hunter, Jack Goga, Jeffrey Bowen) – 4:05
 "Falling" (Tzuke, Paxman) – 3:34
 "Racing Against Time" (Tzuke, Paxman, Muggleton) – 3:22

Personnel
Band members
Judie Tzuke – vocals
Mike Paxman – guitars, synths, backing vocals, producer
Bob Noble – keyboards, producer
Paul Muggleton – guitars, backing vocals, producer
John "Rhino" Edwards – bass

Additional musicians
Andy Newmark – drums
Andy Hamilton – saxophone
Nigel Kennedy – violin
Jaqi Robinson, Diane Wright – backing vocals

Production
Leigh Mantle – engineer, mixing
Bob Parr – engineer on track 8
John Hudson – mixing on track 8
Aaron Chakraverty – mastering
Brian Aris – cover photography

References

External links
Official website

Judie Tzuke albums
1984 albums
Albums produced by Mike Paxman